Psammoecus simoni, is a species of silvan flat bark beetle found in Taiwan, Japan, Philippines, India, Sri Lanka, Malaysia, Indonesia, Madagascar, France (Réunion), and Seychelles.

Description
Average length is about 2.13 to 2.58 mm. The species has short oval habitus and black elytra with yellow maculae. There are two transverse characteristic spots on elytra and two small rounded spots near humeral angles. Transverse spots are interconnected by longitudinal sutural spot.

References 

Silvanidae
Insects of Sri Lanka
Insects of India
Insects described in 1892